Aslan Akhmedovich Goplachev (born 26 December 1970) is a Russian professional football coach and a former player. He is an assistant manager with Akhmat Grozny.

Honours
 Russian Premier League champion: 1995.
 Russian Second Division Zone West top scorer: 1994 (29 goals).

External links
 

1970 births
Sportspeople from Nalchik
Living people
Soviet footballers
Russian footballers
Association football forwards
PFC Spartak Nalchik players
FC Spartak Vladikavkaz players
Soviet Second League players
Russian Premier League players
Russian First League players
Russian Second League players
Russian football managers